Jesse Philo Mortensen (April 16, 1907 in Thatcher, Arizona – February 19, 1962) was an NCAA champion track athlete and coach. Mortensen is one of only three men to win Division I Men's Outdoor Track and Field Championship team titles as both an athlete and coach.

Biography
Mortensen enrolled at the University of Southern California (USC) in 1928.  While at USC, he won eight varsity letters, three each in basketball and track and field and two in football.  In basketball, he was selected as an All-Pacific Coast Conference player in 1928 and 1930.  In football, he played at the left halfback position and was a member of the 1929 USC Trojans football team that defeated Pittsburgh in the 1930 Rose Bowl.  In  track and field, Mortensen was captain of the 1930 NCAA championship track team.  He won the 1929 NCAA javelin title and set a world record in the decathlon in 1931.

After graduating from USC, Mortensen held coaching positions at Riverside Junior College, with the United States Navy during World War II, and after the war at the University of Denver and the United States Military Academy. He returned to become coach of the USC track and field team in 1951. He led the USC Trojans to seven NCAA titles in his 11 years as coach (1951–1961). His teams never lost a dual meet (64-0) and never finished worse than second in the conference meet. He was an assistant U.S. men's track coach in the 1956 Olympics. He also served as an assistant football coach at USC from 1951 to 1955. He coached track at the University of Denver and the United States Military Academy.

Mortensen is a member of the University of Southern California Athletic Hall of Fame, the National Track and Field Hall of Fame and the U.S. Track & Field and Cross Country Coaches Association Hall of Fame.

References

External links
 

1907 births
1962 deaths
All-American college men's basketball players
American men's basketball players
Basketball players from Arizona
Junior college men's track and field athletes in the United States
People from Thatcher, Arizona
Track and field athletes from California
USC Trojans football coaches
USC Trojans football players
USC Trojans men's basketball players
USC Trojans track and field coaches
United States Navy personnel of World War II